Davis Karashani Arinaitwe (born 20 April 1987) is a Ugandan cricketer who is the current captain of the Ugandan national team. He previously represented the Uganda under-19s at the 2004 and 2006 Under-19 World Cups (in Bangladesh and Sri Lanka, respectively). David was born in the city of Mbarara. He has played for Uganda in the ICC Intercontinental Cup, the ICC World Cup Qualifier, the ICC World Twenty20 Qualifier, and the World Cricket League.

References

1987 births
Living people
Ugandan cricketers
People from Mbarara